The São Tomé and Príncipe women's national football team represents São Tomé and Príncipe in international women's football. It is governed by the São Toméan Football Federation. It has played in six FIFA recognised matches and has never been internationally ranked by FIFA. The country also has a national under-19 team.

History
In 1985, almost no country in the world had a women's national football team, including São Tomé and Príncipe who did not play their first FIFA recognised fixture until 2002 when they participated in qualifications for the 2003 Women's World Cup. In the team's history, they have only played in six FIFA recognised matches. On 10 August 2002 in São Tome, São Tomé and Príncipe lost to Gabon 0–2 after being down 0–1 at the half. On 24 August 2002 in Libreville, São Tomé and Príncipe lost to Gabon 0–6 after being down 0–3 at the half. They finished last in the first group round, scoring 0 total goals and having 8 scored against them in two games. On 19 February 2006 in São Tomé and Príncipe, São Tomé and Príncipe lost 0–3 to Togo. On 26 February 2006 in Togo, São Tomé and Príncipe lost 0–6 to Togo. In 2010, the country did not have a team competing in the African Women's Championships during the preliminary rounds or at the 2011 All Africa Games. In June 2012, the team was not ranked in the world by FIFA. The team has never been ranked by FIFA.

In October 2021, São Tomé and Príncipe participated in the first round of 2022 Africa Women Cup of Nations qualification, which acted also as the first round of Africa's 2023 Women's World Cup qualifiers, but withdrew after losing the first leg to Togo 0–5, leading to the cancellation of the second and the team's elimination.

Under-20
In 2002, São Tomé and Príncipe women's national under-19 football team participated in the African Women U-19 Championship, the first edition of the competition to be held.  In the first round, they lost to Mali women's national under-19 football team twice with scores of 0–6 and 1–4. The age grouping for the youth national cup was subsequently changed from under-19 to under-20. São Tomé and Príncipe women's national under-20 football team was supposed to play against Central African Republic women's national under-20 football team in the African Women U-20 World Cup 2010 Qualifying in 2010 but São Tomé and Príncipe withdrew and Central African Republic got a walkover in their scheduled matches against the country.

Background and development
The island country gained independence in 1975, the same year the national football association was created.  The association gained FIFA recognition in 1986. Female players register with the national association starting at the age of 16. In 2009, there were only four women's only teams in the country, which formed a national competition.

Early development of the women's game at the time began when colonial powers brought football to the continent was limited as colonial powers in the region tended to take make concepts of patriarchy and women's participation in sport with them to local cultures that had similar concepts already embedded in them. The lack of later development of the national team on a wider international level symptomatic of all African teams is a result of several factors, including  limited access to education, poverty amongst women in the wider society, and fundamental inequality present in the society that occasionally allows for female specific human rights abuses.  When quality female football players are developed, they tend to leave for greater opportunities abroad. Continent wide, funding is also an issue, with most development money coming from FIFA, not the national football association. Future success for women's football in Africa is dependent on improved facilities and access by women to these facilities.  Attempting to commercialise the game and make it commercially viable is not the solution, as demonstrated by the current existence of many youth and women's football camps held throughout the continent.

Results and fixtures

The following is a list of match results in the last 12 months, as well as any future matches that have been scheduled.

Legend

2023

Coaching staff

Current coaching staff

As of September 2022

Manager history

 Marcelina da Costa (2022– )

Players

Current squad
 The following players were named on 10 October 2021 for the 2022 Africa Women Cup of Nations qualification tournament. 

 Caps and goals accurate up to and including 30 October 2021.

Recent call-ups
The following players have been called up to a São Tomé and Príncipe squad in the past 12 months.

–

Competitive record

FIFA Women's World Cup

*Draws include knockout matches decided on penalty kicks.

Olympic Games

*Draws include knockout matches decided on penalty kicks.

Africa Women Cup of Nations

*Draws include knockout matches decided on penalty kicks.

African Games record

UNIFFAC Women's Cup

References

External links

African women's national association football teams
Football in São Tomé and Príncipe
W